is an adult visual novel/adventure game video game by Innocent Grey for Windows. It was released in Japan on July 4, 2008, and by MangaGamer (with the assistance of the TLWiki) for English-speaking markets on June 29, 2011.

Gameplay
Kara no Shōjos gameplay primarily revolves around reading dialogue with other characters and making choices that affect the outcome of the game.

At certain points in the game the player character, Reiji, is tasked with investigating crime scenes. During these investigation sequences, the player must examine these scenes to uncover evidence and depending on the evidence found, the course of the game can change. After collecting evidence, the player must put it together during inference sequences, in which Reiji must find the best answer from the clues obtained before. However, it is possible to fail an inference sequence by missing a given piece of evidence during a prior investigation; this in turn affects the game's ending.

The game also features a travel system, through which the player can traverse between different locations in Tokyo. The player can only use this a limited number of times per day, and only on certain days.

Plot
The murders are reminiscent of another string of serial murders that occurred six years ago prior to the game where Reiji lost his fiancée, which drives him with a strong desire to solve this case. Later at a park, Reiji also meets a high school girl from Ouba Girls Academy named , who asks him to find her real self. Reiji is initially unsure of what she means, but later finds out that Toko has an unusually complicated past that may have more to do with the current string of serial killings than Reiji initially expects. While working to solve the growing number of murder cases in Tokyo, Reiji takes some time out to get to know Toko and her friends as well as other students from her school while working behind-the-scenes to unravel the mysteries of her dark past.

Characters

The series main protagonist and a private detective that specializes in particularly brutal murder cases. Before the series events, Reiji worked in the police force but then he was forced to quit after the death of his beloved fiancée Yukiko; he lives with his younger sister Yukari-(a student at Ouba Academy) who he cares for dearly and wants to make sure that nothing bad happens to her. He doesn't spend too much of his time at home due to his work unless he's off duty; he enjoys reading history books during his free time, even when he's in his office. He also becomes a substitute teacher teaching history at the same school that his sister attends.

Reiji's younger sister and a high school student at the all-girls Ouba Academy. An old-fashioned, reliable type of girl, she's very close to her older brother and often takes care of him even when he tends to be helpless when it comes to doing household chores and will usually become concerned and worried when her brother has to go out and solve certain cases-(even if they're ones that could put his life at risk). Like Reiji she's very academic, but she has strong interests in entomology-(much to the dismay of some people including her brother) and has a huge collection of certain insects in her bedroom; on some occasions, her pet bugs end up appearing out of nowhere in certain parts of the house. She's a member of her school's art club.

A mysterious teenage girl who meets Reiji with a request that he help her find her "true self". Like Yukari, she attends Ouba Girls Academy along with being one of her classmates and also a member of the art club at her school; despite being one of the most popular students at school, she actually hides some secrets that no one else knows. She's shown to be a regular customer at Cafe Moon World, a restaurant/bar owned by Kyoko-(a widow whose husband died long before the series events).

 Kuchiki's best friend and classmate from school. Sharing the same name as each other-(but spelled differently), the two girls are often shown spending time and hanging out together. Due to her poor background and having to live in a broken home, she is shown to have a severe inferiority complex, because of this she hates her parents, herself, as well as other people around her, revealing that she's also victim of bullying and torment by some of her peers. Like most of the people from her school, she practically worships Kuchiki especially since she's been one of the few people that ignores her troubled background. Since her first encounter with Reiji during a school field trip, she holds a strong grudge against him fearing that he's trying to take her friend away.

Tsuzuriko is an aspiring writer and one of Yukari's classmates/best friend from school who serves as a comic relief in both the OVA and visual novel. She possesses a bright and hyperactive personality and has published multiple stories in many well known literary magazines while keeping her writing career a secret from her school. She's often referred to as "Tojiko" by Reiji claiming that her real name is hard to pronounce, much to her dismay.

 The president of the student council at Ouba Academy. A talented honor student, she comes from a wealthy, loving and influential family; her charisma makes her an idol of many of her classmates.

 Reiji's best friend and former colleague from the police. He and Reiji have known each other since they were students at the police academy where they both join the force and worked under the same supervisor. Even after his friend resigned from the police force, he still relies on Reiji's help in solving cases. He's also a regular customer at Cafe Moon World and has a crush on the owner, Kyouko.

The widowed owner of Cafe Moon World and a close acquaintance of Reiji and Uozumi (two of her regular customers). She is one of the few people who remembers Reiji's dark tragic past and she was also an old friend of his deceased fiancée. Since they’ve both lost someone important and special to them, they’re able to connect on a more different level. Her cafe has a lot of regulars including Uozumi and Toko Kuchiki.

A waitress working at Cafe Moon World who used to help out at a brothel entitled Yukishiro, but after the establishment was shut down, Madam Ujaku took Hatsune under her wing and gave her the name Amemiya. She learned how to write from Shugo when they both lived at the Yukishiro brothel, so she gets mad whenever people say bad things about him.

Also known by his pen name, Shin Katsuragi (葛城 シン, Katsuragi Shin) or Katsuragi-sensei for short is one of the series main antagonists. He is shown to be famous well-known novelist and author of Shell of Sheol, one of his most popular published books. Unknown to most people, he is secretly a serial killer.

A school nurse at Ouba Girls Academy.

Touko's frail mother; she's often very gloomy and quiet type of person who often devotes all her time to her household duties.

Touko's calm and friendly uncle. He deeply cares a lot for his niece as she is the most precious person to him.

Touko's grandfather who seems to be a very grumpy fellow most of the time. He is also the chief physician of a local hospital.

A homeroom teacher at Ouba Academy. A highly unassuming person who doesn't stand out very much. He often advises Reiji that the school rules do not allow for much interaction between siblings. However he does appear to sympathize with Reiji as he struggles to deal with the seemingly emotionless students that lack any trace of individuality.

A half-Japanese friend of Reiji's who works as a tour guide at the art museum that Reiji and the students visit during a school field trip.

The vice principal of Ouba Girls Academy as well as the faculty advisor to the art club. He hires Reiji to search for the missing students at his school and pleads with him to conduct an investigation within school grounds in order to prevent any more casualties.

A psychiatrist at the hospital owned by the Kuchiki family.

Yui's best friend and classmate. She runs into Yukari and the rest of the art club members a lot. She became rather depressed after her friend's disappearance, and as a result doesn't talk to others as much as she used to.

A coroner who forbids anyone to address her as anything but "Natsume-san". Though she can be rather shady with her words and actions, her skill as a coroner is undisputed. Reiji met her during his time on the force, and still relies on her for important information. However, he tries to stay away from her as much as possible, as she tends to require "something" in exchange for information.

A private detective based in Ueno. Used to work with Reiji and Uozumi and still helps out his friends when needed. Married to Kazuna, a former client with whom he shares a lot of history. Since she’s currently pregnant, Shugo focuses on less dangerous tasks like investigating cheating spouses and searching for people in order to worry her less.

A police officer who was part of the investigation team for the Ueno's serial killer and murder mystery. After the case got solved, he was transferred and promoted and has become a police officer of the National Police Agency in the Kara no Shoujo series.

An obstetrician at the Kuchiki Pathological Research Institute. A gentle person with a serious demeanor who likes taking care of people. Helps out during Reiji's investigation. Due to the small amount of doctors they have available, she often has to help with things other than her actual field of obstetrics.

A junior student of Yukari and Touko and best friends with Ayumu. She's revealed to be one of the missing students from the academy.

A famous well known stage actress. She went through a horrific past but then settled down and married Shugo. Seems to be comparatively more calm and mature after getting married. Due to her pregnancy, she is currently taking a break. Though she stays at home most of the time, she'll occasionally stop by Shugo's office from time to time to see to his needs.

Reiji's late fiancée who was murdered by Makoto Rokushiki long before the series events.

DevelopmentKara no Shōjo is developed by Innocent Grey. The original concept was by Miki Sugina.

An audition for the voice roles of five of the main female characters of Kara no Shojo was held in January 2008. 254 applicants attended the audition.

In 2011, a sequel for Kara no Shōjo was announced by Innocent Grey under the provisional title . The final installment  was released in Japan on 25 December 2020.

Release historyKara no Shōjo released its first demo on May 4, 2008 with the full version planned for release on July 4, 2008. Pre-orders of the game will come with a unique special packaging and an illustration book spanning 82 pages.

An English-language version of Kara no Shōjo was released on June 29, 2011, in a collaboration between MangaGamer and tlwiki. The game can be purchased and downloaded from the MangaGamer website. MangaGamer released Kara no Shoujo: The Second Episode in English on October 30, 2015.

Music
The music for the game is composed Manyo. The opening theme to Kara no Shōjo, named , was performed by Haruka Shimotsuki. The soundtrack for the game, named Azure, was released on the same day as the game on July 4, 2008.

Reception
During the month of June 2008, one month before Kara no Shōjo's release on July 4, 2008, Kara no Shōjo'' ranked sixth in national PC game pre-orders in Japan.

Adaptations
A 2 episode hentai OVA based on the game was made by MS pictures and released in 2010.

On January 3rd, 2023, an American, independent international media distributor Media Blasters has announced on their official Twitter page that an English dubbed production of the OVA is currently slated for a late winter 2023 release on Blu-Ray and DVD in the United States, featuring notable voice actors like Yara Naika.

References

External links
''Kara no Shōjo'''s official website 
''Kara no Shōjo'''s official website

2008 video games
Adventure games
Christianity in fiction
Crime fiction
Detective video games
Eroge
Fiction set in 1956
Horror video games
MangaGamer games
Schools in fiction
Single-player video games
Video games developed in Japan
Video games set in Tokyo
Video games with alternate endings
Visual novels
Windows games
Windows-only games